Jeff Wilson may refer to:

 Jeff Wilson (footballer) (born 1964), English footballer
 Jeff Wilson (sportsman) (born 1973), New Zealand rugby and cricket player
 Jeff Wilson (Canadian politician) (born c. 1978), Canadian politician
Jeff Wilson (Washington politician), member of the Washington Senate
 Jeff Wilson (racing driver), British auto racing driver 
 Jeff Wilson (professor), American professor and academic dumpster diver
 Jeff Wilson (American football), American football player
 Jeff Wilson (Vermont politician), member of the Vermont House of Representatives
 Jeff Wyatt Wilson, American film director, screenwriter and producer
 Jeff Wilson (born 1983/84), American contestant on Survivor: Palau
 Jeff Wilson (fl. 2000s), American musician, past member of band Nachtmystium

See also
 Jeffrey Wilson (disambiguation)
 Geoff Wilson (disambiguation)